The winners and nominees of the Asia Pacific Screen Award for Best Screenplay

2000s

2010s

References

External links

Screenplay
Lists of films by award
Screenwriting awards for film